Altyn Asyr (Turkmen for "Golden Age") may refer to:

Altyn Asyr (electronic newspaper), an online publication of the Turkmenistan State News Agency
Altyn Asyr, Turkmenistan, a city in Tejen District, Ahal Province, Turkmenistan
Altyn Asyr (mobile operator), a Turkmen mobile operator
Altyn Asyr bazaar, an oriental bazaar in Ashgabat, Turkmenistan
Altyn Asyr FK, a Turkmen football club
:ru:Орден «Алтын Асыр» "Order of Altyn Asyr", a government decoration (medal) in Turkmenistan
 :ru:Алтын Асыр (платёжная система) banking card system in Turkmenistan.
 Altyn Asyr lake (Golden Age Lake)
 Altyn Asyr (TV channel) main TV channel of Turkmenistan.